Cinefex  launched in 1980, was a quarterly journal covering visual effects in films. Each issue featured lengthy, detailed articles that described the creative and technical processes behind current films, the information drawn from interviews with the effects artists and technicians involved. Each issue also featured many behind-the-scenes photographs illustrating the progression of visual effects shots – from previsualization to final – as well as the execution of miniatures, pyrotechnics, makeup and other related effects.

Cinefex was made available for the iPad, enabling users to purchase digital copies of back issues of the magazine.

Publication history

The magazine was founded by Don Shay, who alone wrote and produced the first issue, which covered the effects work in the films Alien and Star Trek: The Motion Picture. Earlier, Shay had written extensively on the stop-motion effects work in the original 1933 film King Kong, published in the British publication Focus on Film, and had authored a definitive piece on the effects in Close Encounters of the Third Kind for the magazine Cinefantastique. Shay had also published five issues of an earlier fantasy film magazine from 1962-67, titled K'scope (for Kaleidoscope, which appeared on the cover of the first issue), as well as collaborating with Ray Cabana on the one-shot magazine Candlelight Room in 1963.

A defining characteristic of Cinefex is its unusual 8”x9” configuration, a format Shay chose to enable him to reproduce film frames in a format similar to their original film aspect ratio.

The magazine was entirely reader-supported for its first ten years. In 1990, advertising director Bill Lindsay launched an advertising program that enabled Shay to hire editor Jody Duncan, the publication's head writer for several years, and later, associate editor Joe Fordham. In late 2015, as the quarterly magazine transitioned into bimonthly publication, Cinefex blog editor Graham Edwards joined the team as a full-time writer.

In 2004, Don Shay received the Board of Directors Award from the Visual Effects Society for "illuminating the field of visual effects through his role as publisher of Cinefex."

A 2014 event sponsored by the Visual Effects Society and held at UCLA celebrated "36 Years of Cinefex," and featured a panel discussion with Don Shay and Jody Duncan, moderated by Matte World Digital founder Craig Barron.

That event highlighted the magazine's definitive coverage of the most explosive and innovative era in visual effects history, a period that saw the early use of motion control technology in The Empire Strikes Back, the development of computer animation (showcased in the groundbreaking 1993 film Jurassic Park), the pinnacle of performance capture techniques, as executed in 2009's Avatar, as well as advancements in hydraulics and robotics employed in practical, in-camera effects.

In 2014 Shay retired as publisher, handing the reins to his son, Gregg – who took over ownership in 2016.

As larger, better-funded magazines folded, Cinefex – once described in Hollywood Reporter as ‘a niche survivor’ – expanded from quarterly to bimonthly publication beginning in 2016.

In its February 2021 issue, #172, Cinefex announced its final issue of the magazine after 40 years of publications. Gregg Shay, the magazine's publisher, cited the effects of COVID-19 pandemic as a reason for the magazine to officially end and discontinue its publication.

Reception
In 2001, twenty years after the original publication of Cinefex, Ramin Zahed of Variety praised the magazine, writing that it "is one of the few places where you can turn to when you’re desperate for the right information about special effects credits."

See also
 List of film periodicals

References

External links 
 
 fxguide story and podcast interview with Don Shay
 

Bimonthly magazines published in the United States
Film magazines published in the United States
Quarterly magazines published in the United States
Magazines established in 1980
Magazines published in California
Magazines disestablished in 2021